Kapisre Creek is the main water stream of Arhavi in the eastern Black Sea Region of Turkey. On July 22, 2021 heavy rain caused the water levels on the creek to rise, causing significant flooding in Arhavi.

Description  
The creek is notable for rafting activities.

References 

Rivers of Artvin Province
Arhavi District